Giulio Diotallevi (1602 – September 1638) was a Roman Catholic prelate who served as Bishop of Strongoli (1637–1638).

Biography
Giulio Diotallevi was born in Rimini, Italy in 1602.
On 14 December 1637, he was appointed during the papacy of Pope Urban VIII as Bishop of Strongoli.
On 20 December 1637, he was consecrated bishop by Alessandro Cesarini (iuniore), Bishop of Viterbo e Tuscania, with Angelo Cesi, Bishop of Rimini, and Giovanni Battista Scanaroli, Titular Bishop of Sidon, serving as co-consecrators. 
He served as Bishop of Strongoli until his death in September 1638.

References

External links and additional sources
 (for Chronology of Bishops) 
 (for Chronology of Bishops) 

17th-century Italian Roman Catholic bishops
Bishops appointed by Pope Urban VIII
1602 births
1638 deaths